The Digital Citizens Alliance is a United States non-profit organization focused on Internet safety issues. It releases reports focused on malware, credit card theft, online drug sales to teens, piracy, and overall Internet consumer safety. In 2013, the organization criticized Google for not systematically removing videos from YouTube that are used to perpetrate fraud or provide instructions for buying drugs. In 2014 a debate was prompted about the organization's role in thwarting piracy. DCA reports and work have been showcased on ABC News, CBS Evening News, the New York Times, the Wall Street Journal, Wired, and other publications. 

In 2016 and 2017 Digital Citizens worked with state attorneys general on PSAs to warn consumers about new malware risks from pirate websites and to alert citizens on the proper disposal of unused opioids and other prescription drugs.

Reports and Filings 
In 2013, Digital Citizens Alliance conducted an expose on online pharmacies selling drugs to minors. This was followed by a report on online drug marketplaces like Silk Road in 2014. DCA has issued several reports alleging that Google inappropriately profited from advertising revenues on YouTube videos that promote the unlawful sale of controlled substance.

Digital Citizens has conducted reports on whether ad-supported websites were infringing copyrights of movies and television shows. In one report, with Media-link, Digital Citizens estimated that ad-supported content theft was at least a $227 million business. 

In a December 2015 report entitled Digital Bait commissioned by Digital Citizens, security company RiskIQ reported that 1 in 3 visitors to content theft websites exposed themselves to malware that can lead to identity theft, financial loss and ransomware. Digital Citizens has also have provided ongoing coverage of the state of darknet markets.

In another report, Digital Citizens reported that credit card companies were helping websites offer pirated content for a subscription fee.  In September 2014, they commissioned a report via the brand protection organization NetNames reporting how various cyberlocker sites "make millions" in profit. The CEO of cloud storage service, Mega, said the allegations were "grossly untrue and highly defamatory" and 4shared said the report was "defamatory." Mega, however, never actually followed up on its threat to sue.

In June 2017, Digital Citizens released a report entitled "Trouble in Our Digital Midst" that explored how criminals and bad actors are manipulating digital platforms and offered recommendations on how to protect consumers, including greater collaboration to identify and share information on bad actors, in much the same way casinos share information about card cheats.

An August 2021 report by the Digital Citizens Alliance states that online criminals who offer stolen movies, TV shows, games, and live events through websites and apps are reaping $1.34 billion in annual advertising revenues. This comes as a result of users visiting pirate websites who are then subjected to pirated content, malware, and fraud.

Advocacy issues 
Digital Citizens has been active working with consumer protection organizations on Internet safety issues, from the Dark Web to the sale of painkillers and steroids online to stolen credit cards.

According to its website the group has worked with the following organizations and industries on initiatives:

1) Worked with creative and security industries to raise consumer awareness on the alarming interconnection between hackers and online pirate websites trying to infect computers and other devices.

2) Worked with anti-steroids advocates to raise awareness about the ease these drugs are available online, especially among our nation's youth.

3) Collaborated with the pharmaceutical industry to encourage citizens to properly dispose of opioids and other prescription drugs.

4) Conducted investigations of online pharmacies’ willingness to sell prescription painkillers and other drugs to underage teens that don’t have a prescription.

5) Worked with security experts on the rampant sale of college .edu emails and passwords belonging to faculty, staff and students at colleges across the country.

6) Raised concerns about the blurring of the lines between mainstream digital platforms and the so-called Dark Web, including the sale of stolen credit cards, drugs and merchandise.

7) Worked with the legal gambling industry on the rise of so-called Internet sweepstake cafes in states and their efforts to skirt local gambling laws.

Former attorney general Peggy Lautenschlager in 2014 raised concerns that the organization hired lobbyist Mike Moore, who also served Mississippi Attorney General Jim Hood as a consultant on a pro-bono basis. Jim Hood and the Mike Moore said they were motivated by Google's conduct.

References

External links 
 Official Site
  The Multi-Billion-Dollar Piracy Industry with Tom Galvin of Digital Citizens Alliance, The Illusion of More Podcast

Non-profit organizations based in the United States
Intellectual property organizations
Information technology lobbying organizations
Front organizations
Internet governance advocacy groups